Club Atlético San Lorenzo de Almagro is the women's football section of the homonymous sports club based in Buenos Aires, Argentina. They currently play in the Campeonato de Fútbol Femenino.

Las Santitas, as its players are called, are currently one of the best women's football clubs in Argentina. Within its recorded history, they have won three Primera División titles (2009 Ap, 2015 and 2021 Ap) thus becoming the first club other than Boca Juniors and River Plate to achieve this feat. They were also the first Argentine team to play in Copa Libertadores Femenina in 2009, its male counterpart having achieved the same in Copa Libertadores in 1960.

San Lorenzo are one of the only four clubs to be champion of the first division, along with Boca, River and UAI Urquiza.

On 12 April 2019, San Lorenzo became the first Argentine women's football club with professional status. In total, 15 women became the first professional women's footballers in Argentina: Eliana Medina, Debora Molina, Sindy Ramírez, Cecilia López, Florencia Coronel, Federica Silvera, Milagros Vargas, Maricel Pereyra, Rocío Vázquez, Rocío Correa, Lavinia Antequera, Vanina Preininger, Ariana Álvarez, Florencia Salazar and Macarena Sánchez.

Honours
 Campeonato de Fútbol Femenino (3): 2009 Ap, 2015, 2021 Ap

References

External links
 

Women's football clubs in Argentina
San Lorenzo de Almagro
Association football clubs established in 1993
1993 establishments in Argentina